Mehdi Haj Mohamad is a former Iranian footballer. He played as a striker for the Taj SC.

Honours

Club
Taj
 Asian Club Championship: 1970
 Iranian Football League: 1970–71
 Tehran Province League: 1971–72

References

External links
 
Mehdi Haj Mohamad at TeamMelli.com

1950 births
Living people
Iranian footballers
Esteghlal F.C. players
Association football forwards
Iran international footballers